Sekolah Menengah Kebangsaan Seksyen 3 Bandar Kinrara or SMK Seksyen 3 Bandar Kinrara (Chinese:金銮镇第三区国中, literally meaning Kinrara Section 3 Secondary School), is a secondary national school located in Jalan Bk 5B, Bandar Kinrara.

In 2009, SMK Seksyen 3 Bandar Kinrara accommodated 691 male students and 614 female students, housing a total number of 1305 students. The number of teachers were as many as 64.2009

History
SMK Seksyen 3 Bandar Kinrara opened on 1.12.2001. Most of the students then were from primary schools such as SK Seksyen 2 Bandar Kinrara, SK Seksyen 1 Bandar Kinrara, SJK(T) Castlefield, SJK(T) Kinrara, SJK(T) Puchong, SK Seafield, SJK(C) Sedang Baru, SK Puchong Jaya 2, SK Pusat Bandar Puchong 1, SJK(C) Lick Hung and SJK(C) Yak Chee. Schooling began on 7.1.2002 with 18 qualified tutors, 2 office staff and 79 students. This school had 3 blocks of 2 stories and 3 blocks of 1 story buildings which also consisted of Bengkel MPV, the Canteen block and the surau. The area of the school is 25159 square metres including a school field, a basketball court, classes, a canteen and surau.

In 2012, a new principal by the name of Mr. Shamsul Azha bin Md Yusuf took charge of the school. He was known for renaming the school which was then called "SEMESTI" into "SEMESTIB" because the name SEMESTI was used by another school elsewhere. It was also the year the school began having afternoon session classes for students from Form 1 and Form 2.

In 2014, the school's drama club achieved a new feat by representing Selangor.

In 2016, Madam Tan Siew Hong began to hold the position of Afternoon Vice Principal, assisting Puan Hajah Omme Kalthom binti Md Sharif in governing the afternoon session.

In 2019, the school's well-known drama team that went by the name "Excess Baggage" snatched the "Champion" title at the National Level English Language Drama Competition for the very first time, the team was led by Suneeta Devi. 

In 2022, Mr Murti officially resigned as the head of the discipline teacher. Mak Sheng Ming soon took the title.

Achievements
On March 25, 2015, a total of six students achieved straight A's for SPM 2014. The principal of the school expressed that although the number of straight A achievers dropped, the number of students who passed increased.

In 2015, SMK Seksyen 3 Bandar Kinrara has won the "Yayasan Palan Top Initiative for English Language Teaching In School’ award, with a winning prize of five thousand Malaysian Ringgit.

In 2016,The school's drama club, represented Selangor for the second time, this time winning second place in the National English Drama competition. The drama club will continue participating for 2017.

During the Berjaya TeenStar Challenge 2016, the school came in second place in the band category, beaten by SMK Damansara Jaya.

In 2019, the school's well-acclaimed drama club achieved a new feat by representing Selangor in the National Level English Language Drama Competition which was then held at Port Dickson, Negeri Sembilan. The ever so talented drama team that goes by the name "Excess Baggage" won the champion title and brought honor to the school, being the first team from the school to reach the summit of the above mentioned annual competition.

See also 
 List of schools in Selangor

References 

Secondary schools in Malaysia
Educational institutions established in 2001
2001 establishments in Malaysia
Publicly funded schools in Malaysia